The Bridgeport Bridge is a historic structure located near Denmark, Iowa, United States. This span was a replacement bridge for structure whose middle stone pier was deteriorating. The weaknesses in the old bridge were noted in 1887 and 1893. Both Des Moines and Lee counties financed the $5,110 construction of this bridge, which spans the Skunk River between the two counties. The  Pennsylvania truss bridge was built in 1904 by the Clinton Bridge and Iron Works of Clinton, Iowa. It carried local traffic for nearly 90 years before it was closed. It has the distinction of being the longest pin-connected truss remaining in Iowa. The Bridgeport Bridge was listed on the National Register of Historic Places in 1998.

See also
List of bridges documented by the Historic American Engineering Record in Iowa

References

External links

Road bridges on the National Register of Historic Places in Iowa
Bridges completed in 1904
Historic American Engineering Record in Iowa
National Register of Historic Places in Lee County, Iowa
Bridges in Des Moines County, Iowa
Bridges in Lee County, Iowa
Truss bridges in Iowa
Pennsylvania truss bridges in the United States